Antonio Cosentino (born 1970) is an Italian  artist.

Education 
Graduated from the Painting Department of Mimar Sinan University, Faculty of Fine Arts.

Work 
Cosentino's  works are in the Istanbul Museum of Modern Art (Permanent Collection)

Art 
Artist and critic Pınar Öğrenci describes Antonio Cosentino's art as follows;

"In Antonio Cosentino’s works, one finds a wealth of images distilled from everyday life, the depths of personal, memory, and the visual culture of the artist’s city. While the shifting character of highbrow and low-brow art was being discussed in the 90’s contemporary art milieus, Cosentino and his artist friends undertook, as it were, the archaeology of a gaze which brought subculture into question. It is from this period on that Cosentino’s painting incorporated materials from the visual culture of our geography without letting one dominate the others: panels, signboards, wrappings and ceramic tiles. The artist’s images embrace an expression that is dislocated and fragmentary, but also somehow holistic and repetitive, thereby breaking open a third window: a mnemonic space that is at once colorful and meditative... While his memory constantly operates like an archivist, the artist documents all sorts of written and visual data. Cosentino’s mobile and ludic setup once again reminds us of the typical obliviousness of modernity, by suggesting concepts such as the fleetingness of megacities and urban architecture, the loss of human scale and localness, the superhuman speed and even consumption."

Solo exhibitions 
2018   "Summer was a Beautiful Day", Zilberman Gallery, Berlin, Germany
2016   "boxes of cigarettes and whisky all over the sea, feråre, my love", Zilberman Gallery, Istanbul, Turkey
2015   "Mom I’m going out to pour some concrete, with Memed Erdener", Studio X, Istanbul Turkey
2015   "Escape from Marmara", Salt Ulus, Ankara, Turkey
2015   "Painting Exhibition", Nurol Art Gallery, Ankara, Turkey
2014   "Escape from Marmara", Bergsen & Bergsen Gallery, Istanbul, Turkey
2013   "Tin City, Karaköy Külah, Istanbul", Turkey2011 "Time Tunnel" Gallery Kullukcu, München, Germany
2008 "Picture Book of History and Stuff " Pi Artworks, Istanbul, Turkey
2007 "Çimentofayansavize" Evin Art Gallery, Istanbul, Turkey
2005 "Sisli – Yesilkoy", Evin Art Gallery, Istanbul, Turkey
2004 "Istanbul 2003-Concrete Sea", Evin Art Gallery, Istanbul, Turkey
2002 "Luna Park", İş Bank Parmakkapı Art Gallery, Istanbul, Turkey

Group exhibitions 
2010: "Arter. Second Exhibition" 
2010: "Hafriyat. Spare Time. Great Work."
2010: "Tactics of Invisibility" 
2009: "Istanbul Next Wave" Martin-Gropius-Bau, Berlin, Germany
2008: "Becoming Istanbul ", Frankfurt, Germany

Further reading

References

External links 
 Istanbul Modern
 Hafriyat
 Pi ArtWorks
 Martin-Gropius-Bau
 Official Antonio Cosentino website
 Made in Turkey
 Arter

1970 births
Living people
Artists from Istanbul
Mimar Sinan Fine Arts University alumni